The 2012–13 Belarusian Extraliga season was the 21st season of the Belarusian Extraliga, the top level of ice hockey in Belarus. 11 teams participated in the league, and HK Neman Grodno won the championship.

First round

Second round

Group A

Group B

Playoffs

External links
 Belarusian Ice Hockey Federation
 Season on hockeyarchives.info

belarus
Belarusian Extraleague seasons
Extraleague